Doug McConnell is a television journalist who has focused on environmental issues, with programs on the air continuously since 1982.  He has created, produced and hosted many series, special programs, and news projects for local, national and international distribution.  His broadcast awards include multiple Emmys, an Iris, and a Gabriel.

McConnell is co-founder and managing partner of ConvergenceMedia Productions (CMP) in Sausalito, California. One of CMP's principal products is OpenRoad with Doug McConnell, Exploring the West for Public Television nationally.  OpenRoad on Public Television is closely linked to www.OpenRoad.TV, The Traveler's Video Guide to the West.  McConnell is co-executive producer and managing editor for both ventures. McConnell also develops and oversees other media projects undertaken by CMP.

From 1993-2009 McConnell was the host and senior editor of the Bay Area Backroads television series on KRON Television in the San Francisco Bay Area. Bay Area Backroads was one of the longest-running regional television series in American broadcast history, and was consistently the highest-rated locally produced, non-news program in the nation's sixth-largest market.  During his Backroads years, McConnell co-authored two best-selling travel publications for Chronicle Books.

Television programs

OpenRoad with Doug McConnell, Exploring the West
OpenRoad with Doug McConnell, Exploring the West began on San Francisco Public Television station KQED and its sister station in San Jose, KTEH, in April 2009.

Bay Area Backroads
The Bay Area Backroads program aired for 23 years in the San Francisco Bay Area, from 1985 through 2008.

In 1985, Jerry Graham (born Gerald Granowsky in Indianapolis) a former TV announcer, WNEW-FM employee, WGRG (AM Pittsfield, Massachusetts) co-owner, KSAN (1968 to 1980) general manager (1975—1977), and KPIX "Pacific Currents" show host, was cast by Bob Klein, KRON Executive Producer, who developed the travel show for locals, as "Bay Area Backroads". Its first segment profiled, by Jerry Graham, a local eccentric who carved tiki statues in his front yard. At age 60, Graham retired and moved to Santa Cruz.

In 1993, McConnell was hired to complete the 1993 season after Graham's retirement, and remained as host for 15 years, until 2008.  The show's theme was to highlight offbeat individuals from the Bay Area, creating the impression that the production crew was simply encountering them on a recreational driving tour (when in fact, there was a small research team that had planned every show).

Other programs
In addition to Bay Area Backroads, McConnell's TV programs include:

Mac and Mutley, producer and host, KPIX-TV, Discovery Channel USA, Discovery International, and Westinghouse International
The Adventurers, host, Discovery USA and Discovery International
Wild Things, host, Discovery USA
Wild Guide, narrator, Westinghouse International and Discovery’s Animal Planet Channel
Petline, co-host, Discovery’s Animal Planet Channel
Preview Vacation Bargains, co-host, NBC stations in eight cities
Pacific Currents, producer and host, KPIX-TV
KING 5 Magazine, producer and reporter, KING-TV in Seattle

McConnell’s national specials and mini-series include: 
Discoveries of a Lost Voyage, co-host, Discovery USA
Secrets of Alcatraz, producer and host, Discovery USA
Secrets of Alcatraz: Return to the Rock, producer and host, PBS
Secrets of the Gold Rush, producer and host, PBS
Secrets of the Wine Country, producer and host, PBS
Big Cat Tales, host, Discovery USA
Prime Time Primates, host, Discovery USA
The Crusaders, Pilot, producer and reporter, Buena Vista Television

Personal life

McConnell received a bachelor's degree in Government from Pomona College (1967),  and a master's degree in Political Science from the Eagleton Institute of Politics at Rutgers University (1968).

Since 1983, McConnell has lived in the San Francisco Bay Area with his wife, two sons, and a bevy of pets. He maintains a busy schedule of community activities, including serving on the Advisory Board of the local environmental watchdog San Francisco Baykeeper, and has been honored recently by the Marin Humane Society as "Humanitarian of the Year," by the San Francisco Bay Trail Project as "Volunteer of the Year," by California State Parks as "Honorary Ranger of the Year," and by the National Park Service as "Honorary National Park Ranger."  McConnell has received many regional Emmys and other broadcast awards during his long career in television.  In addition, McConnell has been given the prestigious Harold Gilliam Award for environmental reporting and storytelling in Northern California.

Beyond his television work, McConnell has managed significant communications programs for the President's Commission on Coal, the Governor of Alaska, the University of Alaska, The Institute of Ecology, the Gordon and Betty Moore Foundation and many other institutions.

McConnell's most recent venture is the creation of an online travel community called "OpenRoad.TV with Doug McConnell - The Traveler's Video Guide to the American West".  OpenRoad.TV will be stocked with all the video, knowledge and insights that McConnell has compiled over the years and continues to collect. The professionally produced video content will be organized into easily accessible geographical and categorical contexts, with users being invited to vastly enrich it by adding their own stories, photographs and videos. The goal of OpenRoad.TV is to provide a website that's extensive, deep, entertaining and informative, and becomes a valuable resource to help people imagine, plan and book travels and get to know intriguing fellow travelers in the process.

References

External links
Bay Area Backroads Home Page

OpenRoad.TV with Doug McConnell Home Page

Pomona College alumni
Television anchors from San Francisco
Year of birth missing (living people)
Living people
Television in the San Francisco Bay Area